Vimi (1943 – 22 August 1977) was an Indian actress who acted in Indian films such as Aabroo, Hamraaz and Patanga. She starred with Sunil Dutt in Hamraaz and became notable.

Career

Vimi debuted opposite Sunil Dutt in the B. R. Chopra-directed Hamraaz in 1967. The film was a hit, but did not help her career. She appeared with Shashi Kapoor in Patanga (1971) and Vachan (1974). She was the leading lady in Aabroo (1968), opposite Deepak Kumar. She appeared in the Punjabi film Nanak Nam Jahaz Hai in 1973. Her last film was Krodhi, released four years after her death in 1977.

Personal life

Vimi was a Punjabi Sikh girl who married Shiv Agarwal, son of an Industrialist, with whom she had one son and one daughter. Music Director Ravi got introduced to her at a party in Calcutta and later invited her and Shiv to Mumbai. He introduced them to B. R. Chopra and that is how Vimi got her first film.

As Sunil Dutt sang to her ("Na Sar Jhuka Ke Jeeo, Na Munh Chhupako Jeeo"), the enchanting image of Vimi won the viewers' hearts.

Soon after the success of Humraaz, her next big project Aabroo was released in 1968. This film, however, bombed at the box office. Even veteran actors like Ashok Kumar and Nirupa Roy who were also the part of the film couldn't do much to save it.

After the failure of Aabroo things went downward spiral for Vimi who was now reduced to pose for photoshoots in magazines. Patanga, her 1971 film with Shashi Kapoor, also failed to strike a chord with the audience. Thus after successive flop films, she went into oblivion.

In an obituary released after her death, several hostile details were revealed which included her being physically abused by her husband and their eventual separation. Following her separation, she started a textile business in Calcutta but that too failed miserably. Devastated by her professional and personal life, Vimi took refuge in alcohol. 

Finally after a tumultuous and tragic life, Vimi died on 22 August 1977 due to liver disease in the general ward of Nanavati hospital. Her body was taken to the crematorium in a thela hand cart.

Songs

Songs picturised on her: 
 "Tum Agar Saath Dene Ka Wada Karo" - Hamraaz (1967)
 "Na Muh Chupaake Jiyo" - Hamraaz (1967)
 "Neele Gagan Ke Tale" - Hamraaz (1967)
 "Kisi Pathar Ki Moorat Se" - Hamraaz (1967)
 "Aap Se Pyar Hua" - Aabroo (1968)
 "Jinhe Hum Bhulna Chahe" - Aabroo (1968)
 "Thoda Ruk Jayegi To Tera Kya Jayega" - Patanga (1971)

Filmography

References

External links
 
The untold, tragic tale of 'Humraaz' actress Vimi

1977 deaths
People from Jalandhar
Indian film actresses
Actresses in Hindi cinema
Actresses in Punjabi cinema
20th-century Indian actresses
Deaths from cirrhosis
Alcohol-related deaths in India
1943 births